The Bras du Nord-Est (in English: North-East Arm) flows entirely in the municipality of Saint-Cyrille-de-Lessard, in the L'Islet Regional County Municipality, in the administrative region of Chaudière-Appalaches, in Québec, in Canada.

The "Bras du Nord-Est" is a tributary of the south bank of the Bras de Riche which flows to the east bank of Bras Saint-Nicolas which empties on the south-eastern bank of the rivière du Sud (Montmagny); the latter flows north-east to the south shore of the St. Lawrence River.

Geography 
The main watersheds neighbors of the Northeast Arm are:
 North side: Bras de Riche, Sauvage brook, Trois Saumons lake;
 east side: Bras de la rivière Ouelle, Ouelle River, Grand Calder River;
 south side: Bras d'Apic, Bouteille stream, Méchant Pouce River;
 west side: rivière des Perdrix, Bras Saint-Nicolas.

The "Bras du Nord-Est" takes its source at "lac des Plaines", located in a mountainous area, located in north side of the boundary between Saint-Cyrille-de-Lessard and Tourville.

  north-west, up to its confluence.

The "Bras du Nord-Est" flows onto the south shore of the Bras de Riche.

Toponymy 
The toponym "Bras du Nord-Est" was made official on May 31, 1983, at the Commission de toponymie du Québec.

References

See also 

 St. Lawrence River
 Rivière du Sud (Montmagny), a stream
 Bras Saint-Nicolas, a stream
 Bras de Riche, a stream
 Saint-Cyrille-de-Lessard, a municipality
 L'Islet Regional County Municipality (MRC)
 List of rivers of Quebec

Rivers of Chaudière-Appalaches
L'Islet Regional County Municipality